The Fourth Street Historic District is a historic district in Sioux City, Iowa, United States.  It consists of a concentration of fifteen late-nineteenth-century commercial buildings between Virginia and Iowa Streets that date from 1889 to approximately 1915.  Many of the buildings are significant for their elaborate Romanesque Revival architecture. The area is now a local center of restaurants, bars, and specialty shops.

References

Historic districts on the National Register of Historic Places in Iowa
Buildings and structures in Sioux City, Iowa
National Register of Historic Places in Sioux City, Iowa
Historic districts in Sioux City, Iowa